Troy Pina (born 4 February 1999) is a Cape Verdean swimmer. He competed in the men's 50 metre freestyle at the 2020 Summer Olympics. His sisters are fellow Olympic swimmers Jayla Pina and Latroya Pina.

References

External links
 

1999 births
Living people
Cape Verdean male swimmers
Olympic swimmers of Cape Verde
Swimmers at the 2020 Summer Olympics
American people of Cape Verdean descent
Sportspeople from Providence, Rhode Island
Saint Peter's Peacocks
College men's swimmers in the United States